Boișoara is a commune located in Vâlcea County, Romania. It is composed of three villages: Boișoara, Bumbuești and Găujani. It is situated in the historical region of Muntenia.

References

Communes in Vâlcea County
Localities in Muntenia